Ficus benghalensis, commonly known as the banyan, banyan fig and Indian banyan, is a tree native to the Indian Subcontinent. Specimens in India are among the largest trees in the world by canopy coverage. It is also known as the "strangler fig" because it starts out as epiphyte, that is, leaning on another tree that it ends up suffocating.

Description
 
Ficus benghalensis is an evergreen, fast-growing tree found mainly in monsoon and rainforests, that can reach a height of up to 30 meters. It is resistant to drought and mild frost. It produces propagating roots which grow downwards as aerial roots on the branches that grow downward like lianas. Once these roots reach the ground, they take root and become woody trunks and supportive. 

The figs produced by the tree are eaten by birds such as the Indian myna. Fig seeds that pass through the digestive system of birds are more likely to germinate and sprout earlier.

Reproduction
Banyan trees reproduce easily by seed or by stake, and they often spread from the original place by means of aerial roots that anchor in the ground and begin to grow and thicken to the point that they "become independent" from the original trunk, thus managing to "emigrate" sometimes at great distances. The figs are eaten by all kinds of frugivorous birds such as the coppersmith barbet and the common myna. Seeds that have passed through the digestive system of birds are more likely to germinate and grow faster.

Banyan seeds can fall and grow near a tree, sometimes from the very tree from which they come, and they also usually bear fruit in a hollow in a trunk or in a wall or rock. Gradually they begin to grow as they have plenty of support as epiphytes on any object they can use to climb in search of sunlight. Under normal conditions, the tree grows until it reaches a level where it gets the most sunlight, so its height can vary considerably. For this reason, where this tree predominates in a place, rather than growing in height, they spread on the surface, looking for the gaps that are left without vegetation. In general, the crown of this tree extends over a diameter well above its height.

Cultural significance
Ficus benghalensis is the national tree of India.

The tree is considered sacred in India, and temples are often built nearby. Due to the large size of the tree's canopy, it provides useful shade in hot climates.

In Theravada Buddhism, this tree is said to have been used as the tree for achieved enlightenment, or Bodhi by the twenty fourth buddha called "Kassapa - කස්සප". The sacred plant is known as "Nuga - නුග" or "Maha nuga - මහ නුග"  in Sri Lanka.

It is the tree under which Adhinath the first Jain Tirthankara attained Kewal Gyan or spiritual enlightenment.

Notable specimens

The giant banyans of India are the largest trees in the world by area of canopy coverage. Notable trees include:
Thimmamma Marrimanu
Kabirvad
The Great Banyan

This tree is also the largest known specimen of tree in the world in terms of the length of its perimeter, which measures .

Nearchus, an admiral of Alexander the Great, described a large specimen on the banks of the Narmada River in contemporary Bharuch, Gujarat, India; he may have described the specimen presently named "Kabirvad". The canopy of the specimen which Nearchus described was so extensive that it sheltered 7,000 men. James Forbes later described it in his Oriental Memoirs (1813-5) as almost  in circumference and having more than 3,000 trunks.

Gallery

References

External links

Bar or Bargad Ficus benghalensis L., Horticulture, Purdue University
Ficus benghalensis in Himalayas, Nepal. Himalayas (Himalaya): photos, images, pictures
http://www.phytopharmajournal.com/V1issue2.6.pdf
http://rjpponline.org/HTMLPaper.aspx?Journal=Research%20Journal%20of%20Pharmacognosy%20and%20Phytochemistry;PID=2014-6-3-9

benghalensis
National symbols of India
Symbols of Madhya Pradesh
Trees in Buddhism
Sacred trees in Hinduism
Plants described in 1753
Flora of the Indian subcontinent
Taxa named by Carl Linnaeus